The Fifth Street Store was a major department store in Los Angeles opened in 1905.

Name
The official name of the company and store changed many times:
1905–1909: Steele, Faris, & Walker Co. - the official company name and name under which the store was promoted.
1909–1925: Muse, Faris, Walker Co. / The Fifth Street Store: the former being the official company name but it promoted itself simply as the "Fifth Street Store", with the official name in smaller text. 
1946–1953 Milliron's, after C. J. Milliron, the president and controlling stockholder at that time. Milliron joined the stores as an attorney in 1917, and became president in September 1943. He purchased the store from William A. Faris. Continued as Milliron's even after purchased by The Broadway in 1950.
1953–1959: the store was a branch of Ohrbach's, opened November 30, 1953, promoted as Ohrbach's-Downtown

Broadway, Los Angeles store
It was located at the southwest corner of Fifth and Broadway.

The company replaced the building with a new eight-story store completed in 1924. From 1925 the store began to advertise as Walkers — co-founder Ralf (R. M.) Walker would later found what would be San Diego's largest department store chain, Walker Scott. In 1946 it changed its name to Milliron's. The Broadway Department Store purchased the store in 1950 and closed it in 1956, when Ohrbach's bought it in August 1953. The store underwent a $1,000,000 remodel by Welton Becket, architect, and reopened in November 1953 as Ohrbach's-Downtown. Ohrbach's closed its branch and sold the building in 1959. The building still exists and consists of loft condominium (Shybary Grand Lofts, 312 W. Fifth St.) with retail on the ground floor.

Westchester store

Milliron's Westchester opened on March 17, 1949, designed by prominent retail architect Victor Gruen and cost $3,000,000 to build. The grand opening was a large event and the architecture - with its straight lines combined with large curves at the angles; its triangular window displays jutting out from the store; and the deck to its rooftop parking deck – was considered a landmark in retail architecture.  The store was sold shortly afterwards, in June 1950, to The Broadway.

Walker's Long Beach

Walkers/Walker's opened their first branch store in Downtown Long Beach at 4th and Pine - Pine being the main shopping artery - in 1933. Meyer and Holler designed the 1928 art deco building. Walker's Long Beach opened a second Long Beach store at Los Altos Center in 1954 which it sold to The Broadway shortly thereafter in 1956. Walker's sold its Downtown Long Beach store in 1960, but it continued to operate as Walker's until 1978.

Walker-Scott San Diego
Walker's opened a branch store in Downtown San Diego in 1935, which separated in the early 1950s and became Walker Scott.

External links
"Fifth Street Store becomes Milliron's", J. H. Graham (blog), September 18, 2017

References

Defunct department stores based in Greater Los Angeles
Retail companies established in 1905
Buildings and structures in Downtown Los Angeles
1905 establishments in California